Thomas Henshall Wilson Vallance (28 March 1924 - July 1980) was an English professional footballer who played as an outside-left.

Career
Vallance was born in Stoke-on-Trent, and was the son of Jimmy Vallance, the trainer at Stoke City. Vallance began his career at Stoke City during the Second World War. He moved to Torquay United in 1945, playing in the FA Cup First Round, second leg tie which Torquay drew away to Newport County to lose 2–1 on aggregate in November 1945 . He left Torquay before playing a league game and subsequently joined Arsenal in 1947. Mainly a reserve, he finally made his league debut on 4 September 1948 in a 1–1 draw against Sheffield United after Arsenal's regular left-winger, Denis Compton had been injured. He shared the left wing position with Ian McPherson that season, playing 14 times and scoring twice, but played just once the following season as McPherson and Compton monopolised the left wing position. After several more seasons in Arsenal's reserves, he left the club on a free transfer in 1953.

Vallance was the brother-in-law of England international Stanley Matthews — Vallance's sister, Betty, had married Matthews in 1934.

Career statistics
Source:

References

External links

1924 births
1980 deaths
English footballers
Stoke City F.C. players
Torquay United F.C. players
Arsenal F.C. players
Footballers from Stoke-on-Trent
Association football wingers